Defeat may refer to:
the opposite of victory
Debellatio
Surrender (military) usually follows a defeat

See also
 Defeatism
 Failure
 List of military disasters